Zeus is a genus of dories.

Species
There are currently two recognized species in this genus:
 Zeus capensis Valenciennes, 1835 (Cape dory)
 Zeus faber Linnaeus, 1758 (John dory)

References

External links
 

 
Ray-finned fish genera
Taxa named by Carl Linnaeus